Pietro Rebuzzi (born October 31, 1918 in Bordighera) was an Italian professional football player.

His younger brother Italo Rebuzzi also played football professionally. To distinguish them, Pietro was referred to as Rebuzzi I and Italo as Rebuzzi II.

Honours
 Serie A champion: 1939/40.

1918 births
Year of death missing
People from Bordighera
Italian footballers
Serie A players
Brescia Calcio players
Inter Milan players
A.C. Milan players
U.C. Sampdoria players
L.R. Vicenza players
A.C. Ponte San Pietro Isola S.S.D. players
Association football midfielders
A.S.D. Fanfulla players
Footballers from Liguria
Sportspeople from the Province of Imperia